Walter Edward Dixon (November 25, 1920 – September 25, 2003)  was an American pitcher, outfielder, first baseman, coach and manager in minor league baseball. He was a native of  Chatham County, North Carolina.

Despite losing three seasons (1943–45) to military service during World War II, Dixon progressed as far as the Scranton Red Sox of the Class A Eastern League before his release by the Red Sox at the end of the  campaign. That season — also his first as a manager — Dixon batted .368 for the Shelby Farmers of the Class D Western Carolina League. His best minor league season, however, would come in  when, as the manager and first baseman of the Norton Braves of the Class D Mountain States League, he led the loop in home runs (37) and hits (194), while batting .415 and driving home 162 RBI. Incredibly, Dixon did not lead the MSL in RBI or batting, finishing behind Willie Kirkland (164 RBI) and Leo "Muscle" Shoals (.427).

In , Dixon began a 20-year-long tenure with the Chicago Cubs as a manager in their farm system. Apart from three separate stints in the Double A Texas League, Dixon usually managed in the lower minor leagues. Dixon also served as a member of the Cubs' College of Coaches in 1964 and 1965 (concurrently, he managed the Class A St. Cloud Rox and Quincy Cubs, respectively) and scouted for the club. During the 1980s, Dixon also served as an area scout for the New York Yankees based in Florence, South Carolina.

He compiled a 27-year managing record of 1,484 wins and 1,521 defeats (.484).  As a minor league hitter, however, Dixon's numbers were far more formidable: a career batting average of .324 in 1,237 games, with 1,273 hits and 208 home runs, even though he was a full-time position player for only 10 seasons.

Dixon died in Florence at the age of 82.

See also
College of Coaches

References

 Johnson, Lloyd, ed., The Minor League Register. Durham, N.C.: Baseball America, 1994.
 Johnson, Lloyd, and Wolff, Miles, eds., The Minor League Encyclopedia, 3rd edition. Durham, N.C.: Baseball America, 2007.

1920 births
2003 deaths
Baseball players from North Carolina
Burlington Bees players
Canton Terriers players
Chicago Cubs coaches
Chicago Cubs scouts
Crestview Braves players
Florence Steelers players
Greensboro Red Sox players
Greenwood Tigers players
Lafayette Oilers players
Magic Valley Cowboys players
Miami Beach Flamingos players
Middlesboro Athletics players
New York Yankees scouts
Norton Braves players
Reidsville Luckies players
Roanoke Red Sox players
Rocky Mount Red Sox players
San Antonio Missions managers
Scranton Red Sox players
Shelby Farmers players
American military personnel of World War II
Kokomo Giants players